Fritz Tornow (27 July 1924 – late 1990s) was a Feldwebel in the German Army who served as Adolf Hitler's personal dog-handler. He was one of the last people to occupy the Führerbunker when the underground complex was captured by Soviet Red Army troops.

Biography
Tornow had the task of taking care of Hitler's beloved German shepherd Blondi, as well as her puppies, and Eva Braun's dogs. Additionally, Tornow had his own pet dachshund.

During the last days of World War II, Tornow was one of the few remaining German personnel in the Führerbunker. During the course of 29 April 1945, Hitler learned of the death of his ally, Benito Mussolini, who had been publicly executed by Italian partisans. This, along with the fact the Soviet Red Army was closing in on his location, led Hitler to strengthen his resolve not to be captured alive. That afternoon, Hitler expressed doubts about the cyanide capsules he had received through Heinrich Himmler's SS. To verify the capsules' potency, Hitler ordered Werner Haase to test them on his dog, Blondi. Tornow had to force the opening of the dog's mouth while Haase crushed a cyanide capsule in Blondi's mouth. Tornow became visibly upset by these events, more so when the dog died as a result.

According to a report commissioned by Joseph Stalin and based on eyewitness accounts, Tornow was further upset when he was ordered to shoot Blondi's puppies. On 30 April, Tornow took each of the four puppies and shot them in the garden of the Reich Chancellery, outside the underground bunker complex, after Hitler and Eva Braun committed suicide together. He also killed Eva Braun's two dogs, Frau Gerda Christian's dogs, and his own dachshund.

On 2 May 1945 the Soviet Red Army took control of the bunker complex. Tornow was among only five living occupants; the others were Werner Haase, nurses Erna Flegel and Liselotte Chervinska, and Johannes Hentschel. They all surrendered to the Soviet Army troops.

Tornow was taken back to the Soviet Union. He was tortured in the infamous Lubyanka prison in Moscow. In the mid-1950s, he was released and sent to West Germany. From the 1960s until the mid-1970s he was living at Paulinenhof in Hervest, part of Dorsten. He produced dog food there. He died at the end of the 1990s of natural causes in Gelsenkirchen, Germany.

Portrayal in the media
Robert Pugh in the 1981 made-for-television The Bunker.
Devid Striesow in the 2004 film Downfall.

References

Bibliography
 
 
 
 
 

1924 births
1990s deaths
German Army soldiers of World War II
German veterinarians
Personal staff of Adolf Hitler